Rezvan, also known as Kashdom, is a class of twin-hulled fast inshore patrol craft Fast operated by the Navy of the Islamic Revolutionary Guard Corps of Iran.

Design

Dimensions and machinery 
It uses a surface piercing propeller, powered by two diesel engines.

Armament 
Kashdom-class boats are of earlier generations were equipped with a 12.7mm and another 23mm machine gun. Latest versions (Kashdom III and IV) have a cabin roof with a mounted multiple rocket launcher, as well as anti-ship missile launchers.

References 

Fast patrol boat classes of the Navy of the Islamic Revolutionary Guard Corps
Missile boat classes
Ships built by Marine Industries Organization